A phytochorion, in phytogeography, is a geographic area with a relatively uniform composition of plant species. Adjacent phytochoria do not usually have a sharp boundary, but rather a soft one, a transitional area in which many species from both regions overlap. The region of overlap is called a vegetation tension zone.

In traditional schemes, areas in phytogeography are classified hierarchically, according to the presence of endemic families, genera or species, e.g., in floral (or floristic, phytogeographic) zones and regions, or also in kingdoms, regions and provinces, sometimes including the categories empire and domain. However, some authors prefer not to rank areas, referring to them simply as "areas", "regions" (in a non hierarchical sense) or "phytochoria".

Systems used to classify vegetation can be divided in two major groups: those that use physiognomic-environmental parameters and characteristics and those that are based on floristic (i.e. shared genera and species) relationships. Phytochoria are defined by their plant taxonomic composition, while other schemes of regionalization (e.g., vegetation type, physiognomy, plant formations, biomes) may variably take in account, depending on the author, the apparent characteristics of a community (the dominant life-form), environment characteristics, the fauna associated, anthropic factors or political-conservationist issues.

Explanation 

Several systems of classifying geographic areas where plants grow have been devised. Most systems are organized hierarchically, with the largest units subdivided into smaller geographic areas, which are made up of smaller floristic communities, and so on. Phytochoria are defined as areas possessing a large number of endemic taxa. Floristic kingdoms are characterized by a high degree of family endemism, floristic regions by a high degree of generic endemism, and floristic provinces by a high degree of species endemism. Systems of phytochoria have both significant similarities and differences with zoogeographic provinces, which follow the composition of mammal families, and with biogeographical provinces or terrestrial ecoregions, which take into account both plant and animal species.

The term "phytochorion" (Werger & van Gils, 1976) is especially associated with the classifications according to the methodology of Josias Braun-Blanquet, which is tied to the presence or absence of particular species, mainly in Africa.

Taxonomic databases tend to be organized in ways which approximate floristic provinces, but which are more closely aligned to political boundaries, for example according to the World Geographical Scheme for Recording Plant Distributions.

Early schemes 
In the late 19th century, Adolf Engler (1844-1930) was the first to make a world map with the limits of distribution of floras, with four major floral regions (realms). His Syllabus der Pflanzenfamilien, from the third edition (1903) onwards, also included a sketch of the division of the earth into floral regions.

Other important early works on floristics includes Augustin de Candolle (1820), Schouw (1823), Alphonse de Candolle (1855), Drude (1890), Diels (1908), and Rikli (1913).

Good (1947) regionalization

Botanist Ronald Good (1947) identified six floristic kingdoms (Boreal or Holarctic, Neotropical, Paleotropical, South African, Australian, and Antarctic), the largest natural units he determined for flowering plants. Good's six kingdoms are subdivided into smaller units, called regions and provinces. The Paleotropical kingdom is divided into three subkingdoms, which are each subdivided into floristic regions. Each of the other five kingdoms are subdivided directly into regions. There are a total of 37 floristic regions. Almost all regions are further subdivided into floristic provinces.

Takhtajan (1978, 1986) regionalization
Armen Takhtajan (1978, 1986), in a widely used scheme that builds on Good's work, identified thirty-five floristic regions, each of which is subdivided into floristic provinces, of which there are 152 in all.

Holarctic Kingdom

I. Circumboreal region
1 Arctic province
2 Atlantic Europe province
3 Central Europe province
4 Illyria or Balkan province
5 Pontus Euxinus province
6 Caucasus province
7 Eastern Europe province
8 Northern Europe province
9 Western Siberia province
10 Altai-Sayan province
11 Central Siberia province
12 Transbaikalia province
13 Northeastern Siberia province
14 Okhotsk-Kamchatka province
15 Canada incl. Great Lakes province

II. Eastern Asiatic region
16 Manchuria province
17 Sakhalin-Hokkaidō province
18 Japan-Korea province
19 Volcano-Bonin province
20 Ryūkyū or Tokara-Okinawa province
21 Taiwan province
22 Northern China province
23 Central China province
24 Southeastern China province
25 Sikang-Yuennan province
26 Northern Burma province
27 Eastern Himalaya province
28 Khasi-Manipur province

III. North American Atlantic region
29 Appalachian province (forested areas extending east to include the piedmont and west to the start of the prairies)
30 Atlantic and Gulf Coastal Plain province
31 North American Prairies province

IV. Rocky Mountain region
32 Vancouverian province 
33 Rocky Mountains province

V. Macaronesian region
34 Azores province 
35 Madeira province 
36 Canaries province 
37 Cape Verde province

VI. Mediterranean region
38 Southern Morocco province
39 Southwestern Mediterranean province
40 South Mediterranean province
41 Iberia province
42 Baleares province
43 Liguria-Tyrrhenia province
44 Adriatic province
45 East Mediterranean province
46 Crimea-Novorossijsk province

VII. Saharo-Arabian region
47 Sahara province
48 Egypt-Arabia province

VIII. Irano-Turanian region
49 Mesopotamia province
50 Central Anatolia province
51 Armenia-Iran province
52 Hyrcania province
53 Turania or Aralo-Caspia province
54 Turkestan province
55 Northern Baluchistan province
56 Western Himalaya province
57 Central Tien Shan province
58 Dzungaria-Tien Shan province
59 Mongolia province
60 Tibet province

IX. Madrean Region
61 Great Basin province
62 Californian province
63 Sonoran province
64 Mexican Highlands province

Paleotropical Kingdom

X. Guineo-Congolian region
65 Upper Guinean forests province
66 Nigeria-Cameroon province
67 Congo province

XI. Usambara-Zululand region
68 Zanzibar-Inhambane province
69 Tongoland-Pondoland province

XII. Sudano-Zambezian region
70 Zambezi province
71 Sahel province
72 Sudan province
73 Somalia-Ethiopia province
74 South Arabia province
75 Socotra province
76 Oman province
77 South Iran province
78 Sindia province

XIII. Karoo-Namib region
79 Namibia province
80 Namaland province
81 Western Cape province
82 Karoo province

XIV. St. Helena and Ascension region
83 St. Helena and Ascension province

XV. Madagascan region
84 Eastern Madagascar province
85 Western Madagascar province
86 Southern and Southwestern Madagascar province
87 Comoro province
88 Mascarenes province
89 Seychelles province

XVI. Indian region
90 Ceylon (Sri Lanka) province
91 Malabar province
92 Deccan province
93 Upper Gangetic Plain province
94 Bengal province

XVII. Indochinese region
95 South Burma province
96 Andamans province
97 South China province
98 Thailand province
99 North Indochina province
100 Annam province
101 South Indochina province

XVIII. Malesian region
102 Malaya province
103 Borneo province
104 Philippines province
105 Sumatra province
106 Java province
107 Celebes province
108 Moluccas and West New Guinea province
109 Papua province
110 Bismarck Archipelago province

XIX. Fijian region
111 New Hebrides province
112 Fiji province

XX. Polynesian region
113 Micronesia province
114 Polynesia province

XXI. Hawaiian region
115 Hawaii province

XXII. Neocaledonian region
116 New Caledonia province

Neotropical Kingdom

XXIII. Caribbean region
117 Central America province
118 West Indies province
119 Galápagos Islands province

XXIV. region of the Guayana Highlands
120 The Guianas province

XXV. Amazon region
121 Amazonia province
122 Llanos province

XXVI. Brazilian region
123 Caatinga province
124 Central Brazilian Uplands province
125 Chaco province
126 Atlantic province
127 Paraná province

XXVII. Andean region
128 Northern Andes province
129 Central Andes province

South African Kingdom

XXVIII. Cape region
130 Cape province

Australian Kingdom

XXIX. Northeast Australian region
131 North Australia  province
132 Queensland province
133 Southeast Australia province
134 Tasmania province

XXX. Southwest Australian region
135 Southwest Australia province

XXXI. Central Australian or Eremaean region
136 Eremaea province

Antarctic Kingdom

XXXII. Fernandezian region
137 Juan Fernández province

XXXIII. Chile-Patagonian region
138 Northern Chile province
139 Central Chile province
140 Pampas province
141 Patagonia province
142 Tierra del Fuego province

XXXIV. region of the South Subantarctic Islands
143 Tristan-Gough province
144 Kerguelen province

XXXV. Neozeylandic region
145 Lord Howe province
146 Norfolk province
147 Kermadec province
148 Northern New Zealand province
149 Central New Zealand province
150 Southern New Zealand province
151 Chatham province
152 New Zealand Subantarctic Islands province

Regionalization according to Wolfgang Frey and Rainer Lösch (2004, 2010) 

Notes(with focus on Europe, matching the image on the right)
 The central European region and the central Russian region are sister regions.
 The border between them is similar to the Fagus sylvatica limit (January, day-time temperature average: above -2 °C).
 The border between the central Russian region and the boreal region is similar to the Quercus spp. limit (Day-time temperature average: above 10 °C, 4 months per year).
 The border between the boreal region and the arctic region is similar to the tree line, taiga/arctic tundra limit (July, day-time temperature average: above 10 °C).
 The border of the Atlantic region is the limit of no frost (average), Gulf Stream influence.
 The warm islands in the Atlantic ocean are in the Macaronesia region: isolated populations in a more humid environment.
 The Mediterranean region is similar to the occurrence of wild Olea europea and wild Cistus salviifolius (Olea europea is grown very North in Italy).
 The border between the submediterranean region and the central European region is similar to the alpine arc (upper Rhone, upper Rhine, lower Danube), a weather barrier.
 The Pontic region border is similar to the tree line/ steppe limit (less than 450 mm precipitation per year).
 The Turanian region has a semi-arid climate.

References

Bibliography
 Frodin, D.G. (2001). Guide to Standard Floras of the World. An annotated, geographically arranged systematic bibliography of the principal floras, enumerations, checklists and chorological atlases of different areas. 2nd ed. (1st edn 1984), pp. xxiv, 1100, .Cambridge University Press, Cambridge, .

+
 
+
+
+